Nothin' but the Blues is a debut studio album by American blues musician Gary B. B. Coleman. The album was initially released by Coleman via his own Mister B.s Records label in 1986 and re-released in 1987 by Ichiban Records label to positive critical reviews.

Reception
Niles J. Frantz of AllMusic gave the album four and half stars out of five, commenting "With a darker overall tone, it's sadder and more introspective, and one of his more consistent records. It includes two very good slow blues, "Let Me Love You Baby" and "Shame on You."

Track listing

Personnel
Gary B.B. Coleman – primary artist, producer
Michael Slade – bass guitar 
Lawrence Wilburn – bass
James Big Foot Harrison – drums
Jerome Fredrick – keyboards 
Kelvin Drake – rhythm guitar

References

1987 albums
Gary B. B. Coleman albums
Ichiban Records albums